Saint-Denis is a commune in the northern suburbs of Paris, France. Saint-Denis is the second most populated suburb of Paris (after Boulogne-Billancourt), with a population of 113,116 at the 2020 census. It is a subprefecture of the department of Seine-Saint-Denis, being the seat of the arrondissement of Saint-Denis. It is also part of the Métropole du Grand Paris.

Saint-Denis is home to the royal necropolis of the Basilica of Saint-Denis and was also the location of the associated abbey. It is also home to France's national football and rugby stadium, the Stade de France, built for the 1998 FIFA World Cup. Saint-Denis is a formerly industrial suburb currently changing its economic base. Inhabitants of Saint-Denis are called Dionysiens.

Name
Until the 3rd century, Saint-Denis was a small settlement called Catolacus or Catulliacum, probably meaning "estate of Catullius", a Gallo-Roman landowner. About 250 AD, the first bishop of Paris, Saint Denis, was martyred on Montmartre hill and buried in Catolacus. Shortly after 250 AD, his grave became a shrine and a pilgrimage centre, with the building of the Abbey of Saint Denis, and the settlement was renamed Saint-Denis.

In 1793, during the French Revolution, Saint-Denis was renamed Franciade in a gesture of rejection of religion. In 1803, however, under the Consulate of Napoléon Bonaparte, the city reverted to its former name of Saint-Denis.

History
During its history, Saint-Denis has been closely associated with the French royal house. Starting from Dagobert I (c. 603–639), almost every French king was buried in the Basilica.

However, Saint-Denis is older than that. In the 2nd century, there was a Gallo-Roman village named Catolacus on the location that Saint-Denis occupies today. Saint Denis, the first bishop of Me saint of France, was martyred in about 250 AD and buried in the cemetery of Catolacus. Denis' tomb quickly became a place of worship. Around 475 AD, Sainte Geneviève had a small chapel erected on Denis' tomb, which by then had become a popular destination for pilgrims. It was this chapel that Dagobert I had rebuilt and turned into a royal monastery. Dagobert granted many privileges to the monastery: independence from the bishop of Paris, the right to hold a market, and, most importantly, he was buried in Saint-Denis; a tradition which was followed by almost all his successors. During the Middle Ages, because of the privileges granted by Dagobert, Saint-Denis grew to become very important. Merchants from all over Europe (and indeed from the Byzantine Empire) came to visit its market.

In 1140, Abbot Suger, counselor to the King, granted further privileges to the citizens of Saint-Denis. He also started the work of enlarging the Basilica of Saint Denis that still exists today, often cited as the first example of high early Gothic Architecture. The new church was consecrated in 1144.

Saint-Denis was depopulated in the Hundred Years' War; of its 10,000 citizens, only 3,000 remained after the war.

During the French Wars of Religion, the Battle of Saint-Denis was fought between Catholics and Protestants on 10 November 1567. The Protestants were defeated, but the Catholic commander Anne de Montmorency was killed. In 1590, the city surrendered to Henry IV, who converted to Catholicism in 1593 in the abbey of Saint-Denis.

King Louis XIV (1638–1715) started several industries in Saint-Denis: weaving and spinning mills and dyehouses. His successor, Louis XV (1710–1774), whose daughter was a nun in the Carmelite convent, took a lively interest in the city: he added a chapel to the convent and also renovated the buildings of the royal abbey.

During the French Revolution, not only was the city renamed "Franciade" from 1793 to 1803, but the royal necropolis was looted and destroyed. The remains were removed from the tombs and thrown together; during the French Restoration, since they could not be sorted out anymore, they were reburied in a common ossuary.

The last king to be interred in Saint-Denis was Louis XVIII (1755 – 1824). After France became a republic and an empire, Saint-Denis lost its association with royalty.

On 1 January 1860, the city of Paris was enlarged by annexing neighbouring communes. On that occasion, the commune of La Chapelle-Saint-Denis was disbanded and divided between the city of Paris, Saint-Denis, Saint-Ouen, and Aubervilliers. Saint-Denis received the north-western part of La Chapelle-Saint-Denis.

During the 19th century, Saint-Denis became increasingly industrialised. Transport was much improved: in 1824 the Canal Saint-Denis was constructed, linking the Canal de l'Ourcq in the northeast of Paris to the River Seine at the level of L'Île-Saint-Denis, and in 1843 the first railway reached Saint-Denis. By the end of the century, there were 80 factories in Saint-Denis.

The presence of so many industries also gave rise to an important socialist movement. In 1892, Saint-Denis elected its first socialist administration, and by the 1920s, the city had acquired the nickname of la ville rouge, the red city. Until Jacques Doriot in 1934, all mayors of Saint-Denis were members of the Communist Party.

During the Second World War, after the defeat of France, Saint-Denis was occupied by the Germans on 13 June 1940. There were several acts of sabotage and strikes, most notably on 14 April 1942 at the Hotchkiss factory. After an insurgency which started on 18 August 1944, Saint-Denis was liberated by the 2nd Armored Division (France) on 27 August 1944.

After the war, the economic crisis of the 1970s and 1980s hit the city, which was strongly dependent on its heavy industry.

During the 1990s, however, the city started to grow again. The 1998 FIFA World Cup provided an enormous impulse; the main stadium for the tournament, the Stade de France, was built in Saint-Denis, along with many infrastructural improvements, such as the extension of the metro to Saint-Denis-Université. The stadium is used by the national football and rugby teams for friendly matches. The Coupe de France, Coupe de la Ligue and Top 14 final matches are held there, as well as the Meeting Areva international athletics event.

Since 2000, Saint-Denis has worked with seven neighbouring communes (Aubervilliers, Villetaneuse, Pierrefitte-sur-Seine, Épinay-sur-Seine, L'Île-Saint-Denis (since 2003), Stains (since 2003), and La Courneuve (since 2005)) in Plaine Commune.

In 2003, together with Paris, Saint-Denis hosted the second European Social Forum.

On 13–14 November 2015, Saint-Denis was the main location of a series of mass shootings and hostage-takings just outside the Stade de France. On 18 November, a major follow-up raid occurred. Several suspects were killed, including alleged mastermind Abdelhamid Abaaoud.

In 2016, Saint-Denis was one of the host cities of the UEFA European Football Championships, including the opening game.

Heraldry
 Motto : Saint Denys Montjoie ! 
 The coat of arms are described in Old French by the phrase: Azure semé de lys Or (also known as France ancien).

Population

Immigration

Maghrebians

 18.1% of the population of Saint-Denis was Maghrebian. Melissa K. Brynes, author of French Like Us? Municipal Policies and North African Migrants in the Parisian Banlieues, 1945–1975, wrote that in the middle of the 20th century, "few of [the Paris-area communes with North African populations] were as engaged with their migrant communities as the Dionysiens."

Transport

Saint-Denis is served by Metro, RER, tram, and Transilien connections. The Saint-Denis rail station, built in 1846, was formerly the only one in Saint-Denis, but today serves as an interchange station for the Transilien Paris – Nord (Line H) suburban rail line and RER line D. The French rail company SNCF is also based in the town.

Paris Métro Line 12:
Front Populaire

Paris Métro Line 13:
Carrefour Pleyel
Saint-Denis - Porte de Paris (closest Metro station to the Stade de France)
Basilique de Saint-Denis (in the centre of town, near the Saint Denis Basilica)
Saint-Denis – Université

Tramways in Île-de-France:
T1: Asnières-Gennevilliers – Noisy-le-Sec:
T5: Saint-Denis – Garges-Sarcelles
T8: Saint-Denis – Épinay-sur-Seine / Villetaneuse

Regional Rail:
La Plaine – Stade de France: RER line B
Stade de France – Saint-Denis: RER line D
Saint-Denis:
Transilien Paris – Nord (Line H) suburban rail line.
RER Line D

Crime
Saint-Denis is known for its crime, with high rates of robbery, drugs offences and murder. In 2005 it had 15,071 criminal incidents per 100,000 inhabitants, far higher than the national average (8,300 per 100,000) and higher than its department Seine-Saint-Denis also known as '93' with 9,567 crimes per 100,000.

Saint-Denis also holds the record for the highest rate of violence in Europe (31.27 per thousand while the national average is 6 in France) with 1,899 violent robberies and 1,031 assaults in 2010 (equivalent to an average of 6 robberies and 3 assaults per day)

Because the inhabitants of Saint-Denis suffer with daily insecurity and entrenched delinquency, the Minister of Public Safety Jean-Marc Ayrault increased national police force in the Basilica district and the  Landy Nord, classifying them as a Priority Security Zone 'ZSP' since 2012.

In 2014, a total of 14,437 crimes have been reported for 110,000 inhabitants. Police efficiency has been reported to be very low, with only 19.82% of crimes solved by the police.

Saint-Denis made international headlines for violent disorder before and after the 2022 UEFA Champions League Final, in which fans of visiting football teams Liverpool F.C. and Real Madrid C.F. were beaten and robbed by gangs of young men. Subtitled testimony of victims circulated in France, becoming an issue in the 2022 French legislative election. Before the game, French former footballer Thierry Henry said on English-language television "The final is in Saint-Denis, not Paris. Trust me, you don’t want to be in Saint-Denis."

Education

Saint-Denis has 29 public preschools/nursery schools (écoles maternelles). Saint-Denis has 30 public elementary schools (écoles élémentaires), with one of those schools (École Élémentaire Maria Casarès) being an intercommunal school. Saint-Denis has eight public junior high schools (collèges). Saint-Denis has the following senior high schools/sixth-form colleges: Lycée Bartholdi, Lycée Paul Éluard, Lycée Suger, and Lycée d’application de l’E.N.N.A.

Saint-Denis has one private elementary, middle, and high school (Ensemble Scolaire Jean-Baptiste de la Salle-Notre Dame de la Compassion) and one private middle and high school (Collège et lycée Saint-Vincent-de-Paul).

Notable people 

 Nakibou Aboubakari, footballer
 Sami Ameziane, humourist
 Jean-Christophe Bahebeck, footballer
 Paule Baudouin, handball player
 Maurice Beyina, basketball player
 Thievy Bifouma, footballer
 Ernest Cadine, athlete
 Franck Chantalou, karateka
 Vincent Clarico, athlete
 Angelo Debarre, musician
 Pierre Degeyter, composer
 Charles Dezobry, author
 Paul Éluard, poet
 , mayor
 Jean-Marc Grava, athlete
 Auriol Guillaume, footballer
 Abdelaziz Kamara, footballer
 Vasseko Karamoko, footballer
 Jonathan Kodjia, footballer
 Moussa Koita, footballer
 Albert Lebourg , painter
 L.E.J, musical trio
 Loic Lumbilla footballer
 Rosere Manguelle, footballer
 Claude Monet, painter
 Louis-Gabriel Moreau, painter
 Astride N'Gouan, handball player
 Rodrigue Nordin, athlete
 Sabrina Ouazani, actress
 Francisque Poulbot, illustrator
 Michael Raffaelli, painter
 Soukeina Sagna, handball player
 Yannis Salibur, footballer
 Kool Shen, rapper (Suprême NTM)
 Paul Signac, painter
 William Soliman, basketball player
 Joey Starr, rapper (Suprême NTM)
 Brahim Thiam, footballer
 Alassane Toure, footballer
 Alioune Toure, footballer
 Yannick Urbino, athlete
 Maurice Utrillo, painter
 Anne Vernon, actress
 Sofiane Zermani, musician
 Barbara Pravi, Singer-Songwriter

Points of interest
 Basilica of Saint-Denis, a 12th-century church, burial place of kings of France
 Stade de France, the national stadium of France
 Cité du Cinéma, film studios founded by Luc Besson.

Twin towns — sister cities

Saint-Denis is twinned with:
 Córdoba, Andalusia, Spain
 Gera, Thuringia, Germany
 Tiznit, Morocco
 Coatbridge, North Lanarkshire, Scotland, United Kingdom 
 Guarulhos, São Paulo, Brazil
 Sesto San Giovanni, Lombardy, Italy
 Tuzla, Bosnia and Herzegovina
 Nazareth, Israel

References

Further reading
 Hirji, Shazmin. "Outside Paris" (Archive). The Harvard Crimson. 13 September 2012. - Opinion section

External links

 City council website 
 Saint-Denis, a town in the Middle Ages 

 
Communes of Seine-Saint-Denis
Cities in Île-de-France
Subprefectures in France
Cities in France